Jack Sock was the defending champion but decided to participate at the 2013 Shanghai Rolex Masters instead.
Peter Polansky won the title over 3rd seed Matthew Ebden 7–5, 6–3 to win his first Challenger title.

Seeds

Draw

Finals

Top half

Bottom half

References
 Main draw
 Qualifying draw

2013 ATP Challenger Tour
2013 Singles